In Love With You (愛上了你新歌+精選) is Fann Wong (Chinese: 范文芳)'s compilation album featuring four new tracks, released after a five-year break from music. It is available in Singapore only.

Track listing
漸走漸遠
愛上了你
天下有心人
Always On My Mind
逛街(live band版)
Summer Rain
想你
一個人生活
被愛的權利 
Luv³
快樂解薬
月亮的秘密
好想
愛就愛 There Is No Why
我相信
你的溫度
Stay

References

Fann Wong albums
2005 albums